Jocelyn Wang (Wade-Giles: Wang I-jen) is an actress, former news anchorwoman and TV hostess in Taiwan. She is best known for her role as the lead anchor for TVBS-NEWS in the evening. Since November 2005, she has phased out her involvement in the mass media to focus on a career in show business.

Jocelyn graduated from Tamkang University in Taipei with a bachelor's degree in Economics. She has also attended an ESL program at New York University's American Language Institute.

Dramas

References

External links 

Personal Blog
Jocelyn Wang Related Videos on YouTube

1980 births
Living people
Taiwanese female models
Tamkang University alumni
New York University alumni
Taiwanese television news anchors
Women television journalists
Taiwanese women journalists
Taiwanese women television presenters